The 2013 South American Trampoline Championships were held in Bogotá, Colombia, December 10–15, 2013. The competition was organized by the Colombian Gymnastics Federation and approved by the International Gymnastics Federation.

Medalists

References

2013 in gymnastics
Trampoline,2013
International gymnastics competitions hosted by Colombia
2013 in Colombian sport